Mary Elizabeth Banning (1822–1903) was an American mycologist (fungi biologist) and botanical illustrator from Maryland.

She formally described 23 previously unknown species of fungi, publishing their type descriptions in the Botanical Gazette and Charles Peck's "Annual Report of the New York State Botanist".

Career
 Banning's manuscript took twenty years to complete (1868–1888).  Although the Maryland State Archives, citing Stegman, asserts that "At this point in time, no one had written a book on American fungi," and Haines states, "In 1868 there were no books from which to learn about American fungi," neither assertion is technically correct: Schweinitz's Synopsis Fungorum Carolinæ Superioris was published in 1822.  Nevertheless, had Banning's opus been published, it would certainly have been the first illustrated and popularly accessible fungal flora of the southern United States.

She was inducted into the Maryland Women's Hall of Fame in 1994.

Challenges as a female mycologist 
Mary eventually became the "leading mycologist in her region". Despite this, she was a woman, and she had no formal higher education. Consequently, with the exception of her mentor Peck, she found herself largely ostracized by the educated male scientific establishment of the day. Her private letters reveal her deep dissatisfaction with this state of affairs.  Unable to obtain funding and having to care for her invalid mother and sister, Banning "incurred increasing financial problems."

Conversely, her mycological pursuits led to several awkward encounters with fungus-fearing locals, many of which she recounts as asides in her scientific publications.  On one occasion, she rode six miles in a crowded "public conveyance" holding a basket of Phallus duplicatus — a particularly foul-smelling fungus with the common name "netted stinkhorn." By the end of the ride, Banning states that "the smell had increased to such an extent that the flies nearly devoured me, in their eagerness to get at the fungus". The other passengers maintained a stony silence for the duration of the trip.  On another occasion, a man approached her, asking if she had found any "frog stools" that day.  When she replied that she had not, he answered, "And it's a blessed thing you can't find 'em!...Pison [sic] things...Better let frog stools alone!  That's my advice to everyone."  The man then walked away, muttering about Banning: "Poor thing.  Crazy, certain sure.  Clean gone mad!" On yet another occasion, Banning had employed three young boys to collect mushrooms.  When they brought their finds to the hotel where she was staying and asked where they might find the 'frog stool lady,' the waiter replied,  "Off with you! Have you gone crazy? Who ever heard tell of a frog-stool lady?"

In the preface to her unpublished manuscript, Banning discusses the origin of her project in terms recalling then-prevalent natural theology:
"My first idea of drawing and painting the Fungi of Maryland had for its object educational training in a mission school.... I confess to a smile at my choice of a subject, feeling that for once I had stepped from the sublime to the ridiculous. :::Yet I feel satisfied with my undertaking, believing that the study of Natural Science in any of its departments has a refining influence—that when used in its truest highest sense it is the Divinely appointed means of teaching faith as well as cultivating the minds and morals."

The outlook she here elucidates might explain some of her persistence in the face of manifold challenges.

Family life 
Banning was born in 1822 in Talbot County on Maryland's eastern shore.  She was the daughter of Robert Banning and Mary Macky, and was the youngest of her father's eight children (six from a previous marriage).  The Bannings were a well-established Maryland family: Mary Elizabeth's grandfather was a representative at Maryland's ratification of the federal constitution, and her father was a military captain, Collector of the Port of Oxford, and Member of the Maryland House of Delegates.

In 1845, when Banning was 23, her father died. In 1855, Banning, her mother, and her sisters moved to Baltimore.   By 1860, her mother and a sister had become chronically ill, and Banning became their caretaker. Throughout, she maintained an interest in natural history, finally gravitating to the study of fungi.  With her own money, she bought a microscope and started to amass a scientific library and private herbarium. She also initiated a correspondence with Charles Horton Peck, A New York State Museum scientist who, by then, was well on his way to becoming "the dean of American mycologists".

Final years and legacy 

By the end of the 1880s, Mary's immediate family had died, and she found herself nearly penniless, with fading eyesight and growing rheumatism.  She moved into a boarding-home in Winchester, Virginia. In 1889, she ended work on her manuscript, dedicating it to Peck, with whom she had corresponded for 30 years but never met.   In 1890, she shipped the manuscript to Peck at the New York State Museum, writing, "In parting from it I feel like taking leave of a beloved friend with whom I have spent many pleasant hours. Circumstances impel me to put it in a safe place." Peck placed the manuscript in a drawer, where it would remain for the next 91 years. Banning died 13 years later, in 1903. She left her remaining money to the St. John's Orphanage for Boys.

In 1981, John Haines, a mycologist attached to the New York State museum as associate scientist, discovered Banning's manuscript. The museum organized the watercolors into the exhibit "Each a Glory Bright", which has been loaned to museums around the United States.  Plates from the work can be viewed at the New York State Museum's page for this collection. Mary Banning is also the namesake of the provisional species Amanita Banningiana, the "Mary Banning Slender Caesar."

Partial bibliography 

Banning, Mary E. "Notes on Fungi."  Botanical Gazette 5, No. 1 (January 1880): 5-10. https://archive.org/details/botanicalgazette56hano (accessed Aug 1, 2013)
 
Banning, Mary E. "Maryland Fungi. I." Botanical Gazette 6, No. 4 (April 1881): 200-202.  https://archive.org/details/botanicalgazette56hano (accessed Aug 1, 2013)
Banning, Mary E. "Maryland Fungi. II." Botanical Gazette 6, No. 5 (May 1881): 210-215.https://archive.org/details/botanicalgazette56hano (accessed Aug 1, 2013)
 
 
Banning, Mary E. "The fungi of Maryland."  Unpublished manuscript in the possession of the New York State Museum.  Plates accessible at http://www.nysm.nysed.gov/treasures/explore.cfm?coll=29 (Accessed Aug 1, 2013)

References 

American mycologists
American women painters
1822 births
1903 deaths
People from Talbot County, Maryland
Botanical illustrators
American taxonomists
Women taxonomists
19th-century American painters
19th-century American scientists
19th-century American women artists
19th-century American women scientists
Date of birth missing
Date of death missing
Place of death missing